Crystal Lake is a private 51-acre lake along the main branch of the Clinton River in Pontiac in Oakland County, Michigan.

Upstream from Crystal Lake lies 532-acre Sylvan Lake.

Downstream, the Clinton River goes underground in Pontiac near Orchard Lake Road and Bagley Avenue. The river reappears, after being piped under Pontiac for 3,000 ft, near Union Street and E. Huron Street (M-59), where it winds its way eastward to Auburn Hills and beyond.

Ironically, Crystal Lake was originally named Mud Lake.

Golf
There is a public golf course on Crystal Lake.

Fish
Fish on Crystal Lake include Yellow Perch, Smallmouth Bass and White Perch.

References

Lakes of Oakland County, Michigan
Lakes of Michigan